Behind the Iron Curtain is a discontinued VHS/Beta/LaserDisc/VHD video by the English band Iron Maiden. The video features footage of the band on the road in Eastern Europe in 1984, performing concerts in Poland, Hungary, and Yugoslavia as part of the World Slavery Tour. The title refers to the fact that the band were touring inside the Iron Curtain (countries within the Eastern Bloc of the Soviet Union); unusual given the area's separation from the West due to the then-ongoing Cold War. Aside from two promotional videos from the album Powerslave, the video also contains two live tracks and interviews with band members.

The video has no MPAA rating and has a running length of 30 minutes. An expanded 58 minute version of the documentary is included on disc 2 of the Live After Death DVD. This expanded version was broadcast by MTV in 1984 and was, until then, only available on several bootleg recordings. Analysis of the tracks revealed that the audio of the tracks on the original video differ from the audio of the expanded documentary on the DVD version.

The video was produced and directed by Kenneth Feuerman and edited by Norman H. Strassner.

Track listing

Original video version
All tracks by Steve Harris except where noted.

The video also features a portion of the Deep Purple classic "Smoke on the Water" which Iron Maiden played at event manager Dorota Nawrocka and dentist Piotr Zmudzinski's wedding at the now-demolished Adria club in Poznań, Poland.

Expanded MTV documentary version

Personnel 
 Bruce Dickinson – vocals
 Dave Murray – guitar
 Adrian Smith – guitar, backing vocals
 Steve Harris – bass, backing vocals
 Nicko McBrain – drums

Certifications

References 

Iron Maiden video albums
1984 video albums
Live video albums
1984 live albums